is a Japanese anime television series adapted from the manga of the same name by Kazuya Minekura. Produced by Platinum Vision, the series is directed by Hideaki Nakano, written by Kenji Konuta and composed by Tatsuya Kato.

The series is the sequel of Saiyuki Reload Gunlock, premiered from July 5 to September 20, 2017, on Tokyo MX, TV Aichi, BS11, Sun TV. It ran for 12 episodes. Saiyuki Reload Blast tells that of the journey to the west continues. The boys of the Sanzo party are back and looking better than ever—albeit a bit hungry. When they’re not fighting off demons or searching for a good meal—or smokes!—they’re making their way to take on the Ox Demon King. But the weight of the past is finally catching up with them, and getting to India may be the least of their worries. The truth behind their lives in Heaven comes to light.

Crunchyroll has licensed the series, and Funimation released it on home video as part of the two companies' partnership.

Muse Communication licensed the series in South and Southeast Asia; they aired it on Animax Asia and later released on their YouTube channel.

Two pieces of theme music are used for the episodes—one opening themes and one ending themes. The opening themes is "Move on! Ibaramichi" (move on! イバラミチ) by GRANRODEO,
The rock unit GRANRODEO is known as "KISHOW", and "Kisho Taniyama", who is also attracting attention as a voice actor and vocalist, provides a wide range of songs for animation music from melodious songs to hard guitar sound songs, and as a guitarist. A duo unit of active "e-ZUKA" and "Masaaki Iizuka".
Where is the aggressiveness put into the music, their coolness and commitment shines. A fusion of KISHOW's glossy and sexy vocals and e-ZUKA's rock guitar sound. The ending themes, "Refrain" (リフレイン) by Luck Life, A four-piece guitar rock band consisting of high school classmates PON (Vo. & Gt.), Ikoma (Gt. & Cho.), Taku (Ba.), and LOVE Oishi (Dr.). Active mainly in Osaka and Tokyo. While pushing up vocal PON's straight and powerful song and free-spirited energy, it creates a wonderful groove with a thick sound.
The live band, whose vivid live performances that are overwhelming not only fascinates not only the audience but also the co-stars, continues to perform live performances all over the country.



Episode list

References

External links 
 "Saiyuki RELOAD BLAST website 

Saiyuki (manga)
Saiyuki